{{DISPLAYTITLE:C7H9NO2}}
The molecular formula C7H9NO2 (molar mass: 139.15 g/mol, exact mass: 139.0633 u) may refer to:

 Ammonium benzoate
 Deferiprone (Ferriprox)
 Gabaculine

Molecular formulas